The Cherokee National Holiday is an annual event held each Labor Day weekend in Tahlequah, Oklahoma. The event celebrates the September 6, 1839 signing of the Constitution of the Cherokee Nation in Oklahoma after the Trail of Tears Indian removal ended.

Origins and activities
Originally begun in 1953, the event has grown into one of the largest festivals in Oklahoma, attracting in excess of 70,000 attendees coming from all over the United States.  Many attendees are also tribal members of the "Five Civilized Tribes" (the Cherokee, and also the Chickasaws, the Choctaws, Creeks, and Seminoles).  Others who routinely attend the event are the Eastern Band of Cherokee Indians located in western North Carolina and also the United Keetowah Band which, like the Cherokee Nation, are headquartered in Tahlequah.

The holiday hosts many different cultural and artistic events such as a two-night intertribal pow wow, stickball, Cherokee marbles, horseshoes and cornstalk shoot tournaments, softball tournaments, rodeos, car and art shows, gospel singings, the annual Miss Cherokee pageant, the Cherokee National Holiday parade, and the annual "State of the Nation" address by the Principal Chief of the Cherokee Nation.

Celebration themes
Each year a committee chooses a new theme for the annual celebration.  Some recent themes have included:

 Forging a Legacy: Seven Decades of Cherokee Fellowship - (70th Annual)  2022
 Cultivating Our Culture Language. Literacy. Lifeways. - (69th Annual)  2021
 We the People of the Cherokee Nation: Celebrating Tribal Sovereignty - (68th Annual)  2020
 Rising Together - (67th Annual)  2019
 Family: A bridge to the future, a link to the past - (66th Annual)  2018
 Water is Sacred - (65th Annual)  2017
 Stewards of Our Land - (64th Annual)  2016
 Reunion - (63rd Annual)  2015
 Homes. Health. Hope. - (62nd Annual)  2014
 Homes. Health. Hope. – (61st Annual)  2013
 From One Fire to a Proud Future – (60th Annual)  2012
 Jobs, Language and Community  – (59th Annual)  2011
 Happy, Healthy People – (58th Annual)  2010
 Learn from all that I observe – (57th Annual)  2009
 Planting the Seed Corn For Our Children's Future – (56th Annual)  2008
 The Cherokee Nation Continues in Full Force and Effect – (54th Annual) 2006
 Celebrating the State of Sequoyah  – (53rd Annual) 2005
 The Spirit of the Trail – (52nd Annual) 2004
 The Strength of Our Nation – (51st Annual) 2003
 Building One Fire – (50th Annual) 2002
 Celebrating The Seven Clans – (49th Annual) 2001

Covid-19
Due to COVID-19 pandemic, the 68th Annual Cherokee National Holiday was a "virtual holiday." Many events still took place and spectators were able to watch online to see the Chief's State of the Nation address, Cherokee art show, Miss Cherokee competition, as well as, demonstrations of traditional games. However, events such as the annual parade, fishing derby, powwow, softball tournament, arts and crafts, food markets and vendors were canceled and initially set to resume in 2021. However, due to the pandemic continuing into 2021, the 69th Annual Cherokee National Holiday was announced as a "hybrid" celebration featuring virtual and smaller scale in-person events, with the expected return to normal delayed until 2022. After two years of purely virtual participation the 70th annual celebration was held in-person. Officials stated that virtual participation would still be provided for some elements of the holiday due to COVID concerns.

See also
 Cherokee Heritage Center
 Cherokee language
 Park Hill, Oklahoma

Notes

External links
 Cherokee National Holiday Archives
 The Cherokee Nation Homepage

Cherokee culture
Oklahoma culture
Festivals in Oklahoma
Cultural festivals in the United States
Tourist attractions in Cherokee County, Oklahoma